Arnaud Boetsch and Olivier Delaître were the defending champions, but lost in the semifinals this year.

Jan Siemerink and Daniel Vacek won the title, defeating Martin Damm and Yevgeny Kafelnikov 6–7, 6–4, 6–1 in the final.

Seeds

  David Adams /  Andrei Olhovskiy (semifinals)
  Shelby Cannon /  Byron Talbot (first round)
  Jan Siemerink /  Daniel Vacek (champions)
  Udo Riglewski /  Michael Stich (first round)

Draw

Draw

External links
 ATP draw

Doubles